Proportional Representation Society may refer to:

 Electoral Reform Society
 Proportional Representation Society of Australia
 Proportional Representation Society of Ireland